Coruripe River is a river of Alagoas state in eastern Brazil.

See also
List of rivers of Alagoas

External links
Road map of Alagoas

Rivers of Alagoas